Sand Creek is a stream in Henry County in the U.S. state of Missouri. It is a tributary of Tebo Creek.

The stream headwaters are just east of Missouri Route 13 about two miles south of Shawnee Mound (at ) and the stream flows southeast to cross Missouri Route 52 just west of Calhoun. The stream is impounded as a small lake west of Calhoun. From there the stream flows south then east to its confluence with Tebo Creek (at ).

The stream was originally named Little Tebo Creek, but was renamed Sand Creek to avoid confusion. The name was chosen due to the presence of a large sand dune or sand bar along its course.

See also
List of rivers of Missouri

References

Rivers of Henry County, Missouri
Rivers of Missouri